Alizé Cornet was the defending champion, but withdrew before the tournament began. Yvonne Meusburger defeated Andrea Hlaváčková 7–5, 6–2 in the final for her first WTA title.

Seeds

Draw

Finals

Top half

Bottom half

Qualifying

Seeds

Qualifiers

Lucky loser 
  Dia Evtimova

Qualifying draw

First qualifier

Second qualifier

Third qualifier

Fourth qualifier

References 
 Main draw
 Qualifying draw

Gastein Ladies - Singles
2013 Singles
Gast
Gast